Rural East Constituency was a constituency represented in the Legislative Council of Singapore from 1948 until 1951. It elected one Legislative Council member.

The constituency was formed in 1948 and cover the areas of Ang Mo Kio, Bedok, Changi, Pulau Tekong, Pulau Ubin, Paya Lebar, Punggol, Serangoon, South Seletar, Tampines, Teban and Ulu Bedok. In 1951, the constituency was abolished and split into Changi and Seletar constituencies.

Legislative Council member

Elections

Elections in the 1940s

References 

Singaporean electoral divisions